Lionel Snell is a contemporary English magician, publisher, and author on magic and philosophy. He has published works under various pen names, and is most famously known as Ramsey Dukes.  He has been described as "an important early contributor to the discussions of occultism in the mid- to late 1970s".

Career
In his youth, Snell received a series of scholarships which eventually allowed him to attend Emmanuel College, Cambridge, where he graduated with a degree in Pure Mathematics. 

His writings on the English artist and occultist Austin Osman Spare in  Agape Occult Review (1972), and his philosophical theories published in SSOTBME - An Essay on Magic (1974) brought him into contact with the nascent chaos magic movement of the 1970s. Snell was active within this environment for most of the 1970s to the 1980s. 

The novel approach to magic which he developed during this period has been described as synthesizing "the works of Crowley, Spare and Carlos Casteneda into a form of magical libertarianism." Due to his contribution in this area, Snell is often regarded as an important figure in the historical emergence of the chaos magic current.

In 1977, he claimed to have performed a well-known, but notably laborious and rarely attempted ritual called the Abramelin operation.
 
Snell’s book Words Made Flesh (1987) takes a philosophical approach to the nature of reality. In this work, Snell outlines his “information model” theory of magic, which entertains the possibility that the universe could be a virtual reality. This theme was later extensively explored in popular culture through films such as The Matrix.

As well as being a theorist of magic, Snell has also been an avid practitioner. In this capacity, he has engaged with organisations such as the Ordo Templi Orientis and Illuminates of Thanateros.

Since 2015, Snell has been running a YouTube channel, which has over a quarter million views as of July 2022.

Partial bibliography
Works include:

 SSOTBME: An Essay on Magic, Its Foundations, Development and Place in Modern Life
1st edition: The Mouse That Spins, 1974. 
Hardcover: Turner, 1979. 
SSOTBME has been published in Polish as STCMO: seksualne tajemnice czarnych magów obnażone: esej o magii, jej podstawach, rozwoju i miejscu we współczesnym życiu. Zielony Lew. 
 SSOTBME Revised: An Essay on Magic. The Mouse That Spins, 2002. 
 Thundersqueak: The Confessions of a Right Wing Anarchist, with Liz Angerford and Ambrose Lee. The Mouse That Spins.  (3rd rev. ed., 2003)
 Words Made Flesh, Mouse That Spins.  (2nd rev. ed., 2003)
 BLAST Your Way to Megabuck$ with my SECRET Sex-Power Formula. The Mouse That Spins.  (2nd rev. ed., 2003)
BLAST... has been published in German as Zaster-Blaster, Zapp Dir den Weg zum GiGaGeld mit meiner GEHEIMEN SEX-KRAFT-FORMEL. 
 The Good, the Bad the Funny, with Adamai Philotunus. The Mouse That Spins, 2002. 
 What I Did in My Holidays: Essays on Black Magic, Satanism, Devil Worship and Other Niceties. Mandrake Press Ltd, 1999. 
 Uncle Ramsey's Little Book of Demons: The Positive Advantages of the Personification of Life's Problems. Aeon Books, 2005. 
 "How to See Fairies: Discover your Psychic Powers in Six Weeks". Aeon Books, 2011. 
 The Abramelin Diaries. Aeon Books, 2019. 
 Thoughts on Abramelin. The Mouse That Spins, 2019. 
 My Years of Magical Thinking. The Mouse That Spins, 2017. 
 Thoughts on: Post-truth Politics & Magical Thinking. The Mouse That Spins, 2019.

References

Citations

Works cited

External links

Living people
British male writers
British non-fiction writers
Chaos magicians
Male non-fiction writers
Year of birth missing (living people)